Fan chart may refer to:
 Fan chart (genealogy), a way of depicting a family tree
 Fan chart (time series), a way of depicting a past and future time series
 Fan chart (statistics), a way of depicting dispersions according to two categorising dimensions